The Boy's Own Paper was a British story paper aimed at young and teenage boys, published from 1879 to 1967.

Publishing history
The idea for the publication was first raised in 1878 by the Religious Tract Society, as a means to encourage younger children to read and to instill Christian morals during their formative years. The first issue was published on 18 January 1879. The final issue, a "Special Souvenir Edition, Price 2/-", was dated February 1967 and was published on 27 January 1967. It was a facsimile reprint of the first issue, complete with adverts. It had a panel on the front cover giving a very brief history and stating that it would "appear in future as the BOY'S OWN ANNUAL, edited by Jack Cox".

The paper was published weekly in a cycle which followed the school year (Autumn through to Summer) until November 1913, when it became monthly. In total, 2451 issues of the paper were published. There was an extra Christmas Number (edition) of the magazine from 1884–85 until 1912–13 and an extra Summer Number from 1884–85 until 1900–01.

From 1879 each year's issues were bound together and sold as the Boy's Own Annual. In the initial years, readers were invited to purchase covers at the end of the publishing year and have the weekly issues bound. This produced some interesting minor variations in order and contents.  The Annuals ceased publication after the 1940–41 edition as a result of wartime paper rationing. The Annuals included all the text in the weekly (and later monthly) issues, with additional illustrations. Later attempts at a smaller format annual, under Jack Cox's editorship, were the Boy's Own Companion from 1959 through 1963, and the Boy's Own Annual II from 1964–65 through 1975–76.

In 1939, the publication was taken over by Lutterworth Press, and in 1963 by Purnell and Sons Ltd. It was published at the end of its life in 1967 by BPC Publishing Ltd, who are believed to have started publishing the paper in 1965.

Contents

The contents usually included adventure stories and stories about public school life; notes on how to practise nature study, sports and games; instructions for how to make items including canoes; puzzles and essay competitions. One of the stories in the opening issue was "My First Football Match", the first of many by Talbot Baines Reed set in public schools (Reed, who had not in fact attended such a school, later became the paper's first assistant editor); and the first volume's serials included "From Powder Monkey to Admiral, or The Stirring Days of the British Navy". In the same volume, Captain Matthew Webb contributed an account of how he swam the English Channel.

In its first decade the paper promoted the British Empire as the zenith of civilisation and reflected the attitudes towards other races which were taken for granted in Britain at the time. In 1885, for example, it described its vision of "the typical negro":

"The arm is two inches longer in proportion than that of a Caucasian, and the hands hang level with the kneecaps; the facial angle is seventy as against eighty three, the brain weighs thirty five as against forty five; the skull is much thicker ... there is no growth in intelligence once manhood is reached."

Readers frequently wrote in with questions to the paper: answers to these letters to the Editor were included in each edition although the original letter was never printed, leaving the reader to guess what the original question might have been.  The responses given were often crushingly acerbic and to the point.

Contributors

Many prominent authors and personalities contributed to the paper.  W.G. Grace wrote for several issues, as did Sir Arthur Conan Doyle, Jules Verne and R.M. Ballantyne. Robert Baden-Powell, founder of the Scout Movement, was a regular columnist and urged readers "to live clean, manly and Christian lives". Less well-known writers included E. E. Bradford, W. E. Cule, Sid G. Hedges, William Gordon Stables and Hugh Pembroke Vowles. Edward Whymper contributed engravings (including the masthead). Gilbert Davey, who went on to publish Fun with Radio introduced many youngsters to a career in Radio and Electronics.

Between 1941 and 61 there were 60 issues with stories about Biggles written by W. E. Johns.

In the 1960s other occasional contributors included Isaac Asimov and the astronomer Patrick Moore, who contributed several articles about the solar system and would answer questions on astronomical matters in the "You Ask Us" section of the paper.

Editors
Editors of Boy's Own Paper:
 1879 – 1897: James Macaulay (Supervising editor)
 1879 – 1912: George A. Hutchison (Sub-editor, acting-editor, subsequently editor)
 1912 – 1913: George Andrew Hutchison (Consulting editor, died February 1913)
 1912 – 1924: Arthur Lincoln Haydon
 1924 – 1933: Geoffrey Richard Pocklington
 1933 – 1935: George J. H. Northcroft
 1935 – 1942: Robert Harding
 1942 – 1946: Leonard Halls
 1946 – 1967: Jack Cox

Other papers with similar titles

From 1855 through to 1920, there were over a dozen periodicals using the title Boy's Own or Boys' Own.  The first and most influential was Samuel Beeton's weekly Boy's Own Magazine, published from 1855 to 1890. Another was an American publication named The Boys' Own, published by Charles F. Richards in Boston, Massachusetts from October 1873 through December 1876.

The Boy's Own Paper was also printed in Toronto, Ontario, Canada by the publisher W. Warwick and Sons. These editions were identical to the British editions except for a four-page "cover", dated one month later than the contents, which contained advertisements for Toronto businesses. Examples of these "reprints" have been noted for August 1884 and August 1885.

In contemporary popular culture
In British popular culture, improbable or daring endeavours are often described as "Boy's Own stuff", in reference to the heroic content of the magazine's stories. Alternatively, many associate the magazine with well-intentioned heroes who do not have inhibitions about trying to right wrongs.

In the 1989 book Great Work of Time, dealing with an alternative history of the British Empire, writer John Crowley depicts Cecil Rhodes as avidly reading Boy's Own Magazine when he was no longer a boy but at the peak of his empire-building career.

The publication is mentioned in the 1997 David Bowie song 'Looking for Satellites' on the Earthling album. Bowie himself read it as a child.

Quotes

Notes

References

External links
 Digital edition of "The boy's own annual" 1.1879, 2.1879/80 - 45.1922/23
 Boy's Own Paper at Collecting Books and Magazines, Australia
 Waterloo Directory
 W.E. Johns in the Boy's Own Paper
 The Boy's Own Paper archive at Internet Archive

Magazines established in 1879
Magazines disestablished in 1967
British boys' story papers
Defunct magazines published in the United Kingdom
1879 establishments in the United Kingdom
1967 disestablishments in the United Kingdom